Espérance-François Ngayibata Bulayumi (Kinshasa, November 12, 1959) is an Austrian-Congolese writer.

Life 
He studied arts in Kinshasa and philosophy at the University of Vienna (1983-1988), where he received his doctorate and worked later as a professor. He also studied theology in Lausanne. His most emblematic work is Mosuni, which deals with Congolese identity and its link-up with European culture; it includes novel, poetry and popular tales.

Works 
  Das Beichten eines Afro-Wieners 2012
  Ebembe ya Thomson, 2011
  Dealer wider Willen? Wege afrikanischer Migrantinnen und Migranten nach / in Österreich, 2009 
  Mosuni, 2006
  LISAPO: Ein Tor zu afrikanischen Märchen, 2002
  Sterbebegleitung als Lebensbegleitung: Eine imperative ethische Notwendigkeit, 2001
  Congo 2000 : Fin du temps ou nouvelle naissance?, 2000
  Esakoli.Großvater erzählt: Geschichten und Fabeln aus dem Kongo, 1999

References and external links

1959 births
Living people
People from Kinshasa
Democratic Republic of the Congo writers
Democratic Republic of the Congo male writers
Democratic Republic of the Congo writers in French
Austrian male writers
Lingala-language writers
University of Vienna alumni
Academic staff of the University of Vienna
Democratic Republic of the Congo emigrants to Austria
French-language writers from Austria